The 2010 World University Boxing Championships were held in Ulaanbaatar, Mongolia from October 4 – 10. The Championships was staged in 10 weight categories with bouts of three three-minute rounds with a one-minute rest between rounds, according to the current rules of the AIBA.

Participating nations

Results
Bronze medals are awarded to both losing semi-finalists.

Medal count table

See also
2010 World University Baseball Championship
2010 World University Rugby Sevens Championship

References
4th World University Boxing Championship

World University Boxing Championships
World University
World University
Sport in Mongolia
Box
21st century in Ulaanbaatar
International boxing competitions hosted by Mongolia